Nguyễn Nam Sơn, real name Nguyễn Vạn Thọ (1890–1973) was a Vietnamese painter who taught at the École des Beaux-Arts de l’Indochine in Hanoi from 1927 to 1945.  He was initially appointed as an assistant to Victor Tardieu, the founder of the school, on February 18, 1925.

Works
Many of his works are in the Vietnam National Museum of Fine Arts, Hanoi:

References

1890 births
1973 deaths
École des Beaux-Arts alumni
20th-century Vietnamese painters